Nystalus is a genus of puffbirds in the family Bucconidae.

The genus Nystalus was introduced in 1863 by the German ornithologists Jean Cabanis and Ferdinand Heine. The genus name is from Ancient Greek nustalos meaning "drowsy". The type species was designated in 1882 as the caatinga puffbird by Philip Sclater.

The genus contains the following six species:

References

 
Taxonomy articles created by Polbot